Endoderm is the innermost of the three primary germ layers in the very early embryo. The other two layers are the ectoderm (outside layer) and mesoderm (middle layer). Cells migrating inward along the archenteron form the inner layer of the gastrula, which develops into the endoderm.

The endoderm consists at first of flattened cells, which subsequently become columnar. It forms the epithelial lining of multiple systems.

In plant biology, endoderm corresponds to the innermost part of the cortex (bark) in young shoots and young roots often consisting of a single cell layer. As the plant becomes older, more endoderm will lignify.

Production

The following chart shows the tissues produced by the endoderm.
The embryonic endoderm develops into the interior linings of two tubes in the body, the digestive and respiratory tube.

Liver and pancreas cells are believed to derive from a common precursor.

In humans, the endoderm can differentiate into distinguishable organs after 5 weeks of embryonic development.

Additional images

See also 

Ectoderm
Germ layer
Histogenesis
Mesoderm
Organogenesis
Endodermal sinus tumor
Gastrulation
Cell differentiation
Triploblasty
List of human cell types derived from the germ layers

References 

 
Germ layers
Developmental biology
Embryology
Gastrulation